Parasikukia maculata is a species of cyprinid fish which is found in the Mekong in Thailand, Laos and Cambodia as well as the Mae Klong, Chao Phraya and south eastern river systems in Thailand and the westward drainages of the Cardamom Hills in Cambodia. It is the only member of its genus.

References
 

Cyprinid fish of Asia
Fish of Thailand
Fish described in 2000